George Dick may refer to:

 George Frederick Dick (1881–1967), American physician and bacteriologist
 George Dick (Governor of Bombay) (1739–1818), Governor of Bombay, 1792–1795
 George Dick (footballer) (1921–1960), Scottish Guardsman, boxer, and professional footballer and manager
 George W. Dick (born 1964), American writer, actor, director and musician
 George Deek, First Arab-Christian Israeli serving as an ambassador for Israel.